Hate media is a form of violence which helps demonize and stigmatize people that belong to different groups. This type of media has had an influential role in the incitement of genocide, with its most infamous cases perhaps being Radio Televizija Srbije during wars in Yugoslavia, Radio Télévision Libre des Milles Collines (RTLM) during the Rwandan genocide and Nazi Germany’s Der Stürmer.

Hate media as a crime against humanity

While the hate speech promoted by these types of media can be prosecuted differently under the national laws of several countries, because of its proven ability to contribute to and incite genocide, hate media used to foment the cleansing of a particular national, ethnic, racial or religious group in whole or in part can be prosecuted under international law for incitement to genocide. Incitement to Genocide was declared a crime against humanity under the Nuremberg Trials. Nevertheless, under the laws of Nuremberg, only hate media propaganda which calls for direct extermination is considered a crime against humanity. After the crimes committed in former Yugoslavia and Rwanda, this definition was modified and a new definition was provided for the Rwandan tribunals. According to this definition, hate media propaganda considered to be a crime against humanity must be involved in the direct and indirect incitement of genocide which "must be defined as directly provoking the perpetrator(s) to commit genocide, whether through speeches, shouting, or threats uttered in public spaces or at public gatherings or through the sale or dissemination of ... written material or printed matter ... or through the public display of placards or posters, or through another means of audiovisual communication."

Radio Televizija Srbije (RTS1) and War in Yugoslavia

Propaganda as part of the indictment against Milošević 
Two members of the Federal Security Service (KOG) testified for the prosecution in Milosevic's trial about their involvement in Milošević's propaganda campaign. Slobodan Lazarević revealed alleged KOG clandestine activities designed to undermine the peace process, including mining a soccer field, a water tower and the reopened railway between Zagreb and Belgrade. These actions were blamed on Croats. Mustafa Candić, one of four assistant chiefs of KOG, described the use of technology to fabricate conversations, making it sound as if Croat authorities were telling Croats in Serbia to leave for an ethnically pure Croatia. The conversation was broadcast following a Serb attack on Croatians living in Serbia, forcing them to flee. He testified to another instance of disinformation involving a television broadcast of corpses, described as Serb civilians killed by Croats. Candić testified that he believed they were in fact the bodies of Croats killed by Serbs, though this statement has not been verified. He also corroborated the existence of Operations Opera and Labrador.

Propaganda as a war crime in the Šešelj's case 
Propaganda as a war crime (incitement to genocide) is the subject in the recent indictment of Vojislav Šešelj, the head of the Serbian Radical Party and an active player throughout the wars in the former Yugoslavia. According to the indictment, Šešelj bears individual criminal responsibility for instigating crimes, including murder, torture and forcible expulsion on ethnic grounds. It reads, "By using the word 'instigated,' the Prosecution charges that the accused Vojislav Šešelj's speeches, communications, acts and/or omissions contributed to the perpetrators' decision to commit the crimes alleged."

Radio Télévision Libre des Mille Collines and the Rwandan Genocide 
RTLM contributed to the Rwandan genocide by helping the Rwandan authorities “spur and direct killings in both those areas most eager to attack Tutsi members of the Hutu opposition and in areas where the killings initially were resisted.” Hence, it helped not only raise hate against the Tutsis by emphasizing their cruelty and ruthlessness and exhort “all citizens to see killing Tutsis as their responsibility,” but also give the instructions and orders which were necessary in directing people to commit genocide. As General Romeo Dallaire has argued, the RTML was created specifically as a tool of genocidaires to demonize Tutsi, lay the groundwork, then literally drive on the killing once the genocide started.” In accordance with the definition of hate media propaganda as a crime against humanity established in Nuremberg and redefined in the International Criminal Tribunal for Rwanda, Ferdinand Nahimana and Jean-Bosco Barayagwiza, both the founding members of the RTLM were sentenced to life in prison under the ICTR.

Der Stürmer and Genocide 

The weekly tabloid Der Sturmer was also said to incite the genocide of the Jewish people during the Holocaust by fomenting hate which allowed such an event to take place in German society. It promoted this hate by vilifying the Jewish people and fomenting racial stereotypes, particularly among its less educated audience. For this reason, its publisher, Julius Streicher, was accused of incitement to genocide during the Nuremberg Trials and sentenced to death by hanging.

References 

Media
Propaganda